Aadami is a village in Kastre Parish, Tartu County in eastern Estonia. In 2012, it had a population of 44.

References

Villages in Tartu County